, is a Japanese manga series written by George Abe and illustrated by Masasumi Kakizaki. It was serialized in Shogakukan's seinen manga magazine Weekly Young Sunday from November 2002 to July 2008, when the magazine ceased publication; it was then transferred to Weekly Big Comic Spirits, where it ran from June 2009 to January 2010. Its chapters were collected in twenty-two tankōbon volumes. The story is set in the 1950s and focuses on six junior delinquents aged sixteen to seventeen that are sent to the Shōnan Special Reform School. They learn to cope with the atrocities and unfairness they encounter there.

A twenty-six episode anime television series adaptation produced by Madhouse and directed by Hiroshi Kōjina was broadcast on Nippon TV from April to September 2010.

As of March 2010, the manga had over 3.3 million copies in circulation. In 2006, the manga won the 51st Shogakukan Manga Award in the general category.

Plot
Set in the 1950s, the story centers around six junior delinquents and their mentor at the Shōnan Special Reformatory near Tokyo. The manga follows the boys' lives during their time in the school and the years after they leave, highlighting the struggles the lower class faced in post-war Japanese society.

Characters

Aged seventeen and nicknamed , he is the unofficial leader of the six new boys. He was sentenced after inflicting life-threatening injuries to one of his teachers when he discovered the man had just raped a female student. He tried to pick a fight with Sakuragi the first day they met but was knocked out easily. Mario came to admire Sakuragi and began to train to box under him and was shown to be quite skilled. He has demonstrated to be a very straight man, and will often take the blame or suffer injuries for the sake of others. After leaving the reformatory he works as a bartender, and is in love with Setsuko. He has black hair, making him resemble Sakuragi. He eventually become a boxer to honor Rokurouta's dream to become a world champion.

Aged eighteen and nicknamed  by his cellmates, he is the oldest of the seven protagonists in Rainbow. He was sentenced for inflicting bodily harm upon an American soldier. A strong and benevolent young man, Bro has great boxing technique which he demonstrated by knocking out all six newcomers when Mario started a fight. He constantly looks out for the well-being of his cellmates, just like they treasure him. This often means sacrificing himself for them, making him the routine victim of Ishihara's schemes. He is the only boy at the school who does not fear Ishihara. When he was younger, his father and five brothers went off to war. Only his father survived and returned home a broken man and a drunk. His father later committed suicide after arguing with Bro one night, leaving him racked with guilt. As a result of this, Bro resolves to never lose anyone else important to him. His friend and former cellmate, was violated by Dr. Sasaki. Before committing suicide because of the rape, Hagino wrote a suicidal note which blames both Ishihara and Sasaki, giving Bro evidence of their crimes. Due to this, Ishihara and Dr. Sasaki both want him dead. Later on he is stabbed by Ishihara on the day of Mario's match, shortly after he made his way to the arena while unknowingly gripping the knife that he was stabbed with. Unaware of his surroundings as he made his way to the arena, he was shot by American soldiers who thought he had the intention of harming people.

Aged sixteen and nicknamed  from his love of biting, he is the smallest of the seven boys. He was sent to the disciplinary school for theft, con, dine-and-dash, and several other crimes which could not be fully investigated during his detention. He lost his entire family in an atom bomb explosion. Despite having no real fighting skills or strength, he has very powerful jaws which he is quite proud of. After leaving the reformatory he becomes a very skilled and dedicated black market businessman, earning large amounts of money by selling cigars within the USA army vicinity. He has rather abundant reddish brown hair. He eventually become a money lender and through years of hard works he opened up his own money lending agency and amassed a fortune. 

Aged seventeen and nicknamed  from his dream to serve, he is one of the largest of the boys. He was sent to the disciplinary school for acts of violence and false imprisonments. He ruthlessly beat and injured his mother's boyfriend, who was abusing her. He was one of the boys who showed the most animosity towards Sakuragi when they first met, but later came to have the most respect for him. Under Sakuragi's advice, he began exercising with the goal of eventually joining the army. He is best friends with Cabbage and the two work out together. He tends to remain very disciplined when in conflict most of the time, but when the situation requires for it, he will take drastic measures such as putting himself at risk. After leaving the reformatory he joins the army. Towards the end of manga he worked at Shōnan Special Reformatory where he tried to steer delinquent kid back to the norm with kind and compassion as opposed to Ishihara. He married Meg and eventually they had a pair of twins toward the end of manga.

Aged seventeen and nicknamed  from his favorite motto, he is the most intelligent of the seven boys. He was sent to the disciplinary school for fraud, usurpation and luggage theft, particularly in shopping centers. When he was young he and his mother were very poor. After learning that his mother sold her body to acquire food, he grew to distrust everyone. It was only after meeting Sakuragi and the others that he learned to value friendship again. While he has no fighting skills of his own, he is incredibly smart, capable of thinking of very complicated plans, which have helped the boys multiple times. He is apparently studying after leaving the reformatory. He grows his hair later on. He eventually worked in a law firm to protect the innocent while worked hard on passing his bar exam to become a licensed lawyer.

Aged seventeen and nicknamed , he is the quietest of the boys. He was sent to the disciplinary school for illicit sexual relationships and inflicting life-threatening injuries upon a man who attempted to rape him. He is an orphan and has a younger sister named Meg. He is half-European, half-Japanese and his unusual pale skin and blue eyes gives him a somewhat innocent, vulnerable look. However, he is shown to be very strong when he tied up Dr. Sasaki. He can also be very menacing when he has any upper hand of some sort. He wants to sing so as to reach his sister. He grows out his blonde hair later on. Joe become a successful singer at the end of the manga and his unusual feature makes him very popular with female fans.

Aged seventeen and nicknamed  from the tattoo of an Ariocarpus retusus on his right shoulder, he is one of the largest of the boys. He was sent to the disciplinary school for drunken violence and assault related to underage drinking. Despite his crimes and intimidating physical size, he is normally very kind-hearted and quiet. He enjoys eating and tends to be the most cheerful of the boys. He is best friends with Soldier, and although he claims he is not very smart, he is capable of feats that have helped them at times. He later works for a construction company, although he claims he does this to enjoy the food. He eventually quit become a construction worker and went on to become a professional wrestler and also Mario's boxing assistant.

A female nurse who sheltered escapees from the reformatory and is Sakuragi's lover. She later fell in love with Mario, but left him not too long after. She eventually married  and had a son named .

One of the Shōnan Special Reformatory's senior guards. Ishihara is a brutal and sadistic man who enjoys beating and punishing students for the slightest reason. Of all the students, he has the greatest grudge against Sakuragi, who shows no fear of Ishihara nor falls for his schemes. This has made Ishihara secretly afraid of Sakuragi, especially when Sakuragi stares at him, which drives him to want to kill Sakuragi. He neither cares for or respects any student or guard at the school except for Dr. Sasaki, who pays him so he can violate the boys. After leaving the reformatory, he is seen on the coast, in a very poor and emaciated state. After being confronted by Mario, he is left at its mercy, given his now miserable life.

The doctor at the Shōnan Special Reformatory. He will often publicly say, "We must treat the children well." Secretly however, Sasaki is a pedophile and regularly sexually molests boys at the school. Sasaki will usually pay Ishihara to send prisoners to him so he can violate them; something that Ishihara himself finds pleasure with, due to his sadistic nature. In the past, Sasaki violated one of Sakuragi's former cellmates, Hagino, resulting in the boy committing suicide. Sasaki, like Ishihara, wants to kill Sakuragi before he leaves the school because Sakuragi has knowledge of Sasaki's crimes and can prove them. After leaving the reformatory he aims to be a mayor, however his plans break apart when the six boys force him to confess all his crimes, which after being recorded are announced at a public broadcast.

Media

Manga

Rainbow is written by George Abe and illustrated by Masasumi Kakizaki. Abe wrote the series based on his own experience in prison. The manga began its serialization in Shogakukan's seinen manga magazine Weekly Young Sunday on November 21, 2002. After Weekly Young Sunday ceased its publication on July 31, 2008, the series was transferred to Weekly Big Comic Spirits, starting on June 15, 2009. The series finished on January 4, 2010. Shogakukan collected its chapters in twenty-two tankōbon volumes, released from April 5, 2003, to February 27, 2010.

Anime

An anime television series adaptation of 10 volumes of the manga was produced by Nippon Television, VAP and animation studio Madhouse and directed by Hiroshi Kōjina, with Hideo Takayashiki handling series composition, Ai Kikuchi designing the characters and Yū Takami composing the music. The series ran for 26 episodes on Nippon TV from April 6 to September 28, 2010. The opening theme is "We're Not Alone", performed by Coldrain, and the ending theme is "A Far-Off Distance", performed by Galneryus. Funimation simulcasted the series with English subtitles in 2010.

Reception

As of March 2010, the manga had over 3.3 million copies in circulation. In 2006, Rainbow: Nisha Rokubō no Shichinin won the 51st Shogakukan Manga Award in the General category, sharing the award with A Spirit of the Sun.

See also
 Yomotsuhegui, another manga series illustrated by Masasumi Kakizaki

Notes

References

Further reading

External links
Anime official website (Nippon TV) 
Anime official website (VAP) 

2002 manga
2010 comics endings
Comics set in the 1950s
Comics set in Tokyo
Drama anime and manga
Funimation
Madhouse (company)
Prisons in anime and manga
Seinen manga
Shogakukan manga
Winners of the Shogakukan Manga Award for general manga